The 1992 Santa Clara Broncos football team represented Santa Clara University during the 1992 NCAA Division II football season. The Broncos were led by eighth-year head coach Terry Malley and played home games on campus at Buck Shaw Stadium in Santa Clara, California. Santa Clara finished the season with a record of four wins and six losses  and were outscored by their opponents  for the season.

Santa Clara competed in the last year of the Western Football Conference (WFC). The WFC folded in part because of a new NCAA rule that prohibited member institutions who competed at the  level in other sports to compete at the  level in football. Rather than move up to D-I for football, the university discontinued the football program after this season. Rival Saint Mary's continued its football program as an NCAA Division I-AA independent for 11 more seasons.

In eight seasons as head coach of the Broncos, Malley compiled a  record.

Schedule

References

Santa Clara
Santa Clara Broncos football seasons
Santa Clara Broncos football